Thorpdale Railway Station was located in Thorpdale, Victoria and was the terminus of the Thorpdale railway line.

History
Thorpdale Railway Station was opened on Tuesday 8 May 1888 as Warrington and renamed Thorpdale on 1 July 1888. It closed on 3 December 1958. Little evidence remains of the station itself.

Facilities
Apart from a passenger platform, the station yard included; a  turntable, sheep and cattle yards, a  crane, and a goods platform.

External links
Thorpdale station Vicsig

References

Disused railway stations in Victoria (Australia)
Railway stations in Australia opened in 1888
Railway stations closed in 1958
Transport in Gippsland (region)
Shire of Baw Baw